Michael Jonzon (born 21 April 1972) is a Swedish professional golfer.

Jonzon was born in Skara, Sweden. He turned professional in 1991 and has spent most of his career on the European Tour and the Challenge Tour. He has two European Tour titles, the 1997 Portuguese Open and the 2009 Castelló Masters Costa Azahar, and several wins in lower level professional events.

Professional wins (8)

European Tour wins (2)

Challenge Tour wins (2)

Other wins (4)
1993 Sundvall Open (Swedish Mini-Tour)
1994 Kinnaborg Open (Swedish Mini-Tour)
1997 Open Novotel Perrier (with Anders Forsbrand)
2006 Rosén Open (Swedish Mini-Tour)

Playoff record
European Senior Tour playoff record (0–1)

Results in major championships

Note: Jonzon only played in The Open Championship.

CUT = missed the half-way cut
"T" = tied

Results in World Golf Championships

"T" = Tied

See also
2012 European Tour Qualifying School graduates

References

External links

Swedish male golfers
European Tour golfers
Sportspeople from Västra Götaland County
People from Skara Municipality
1972 births
Living people
20th-century Swedish people